These are the line-ups of Junoon, a sufi rock band from Lahore, Pakistan, formed in 1990 by songwriter/guitarist Salman Ahmad, former keyboardist Nusrat Hussain, and former vocalist Ali Azmat. Junoon is Southeast Asia's most successful band with more than 30 million sold albums worldwide.

Although Junoon has been prominent in their home country since the release of their first single, "Talaash" (1993) and debut self-titled album Junoon, they did not achieve worldwide fame until the release of the albums Inquilaab, Azadi and Parvaaz, which were released in 1996, 1997 and 1999 respectively. Their 1997 album, Azadi, which has sold more than half million copies, and hit platinum sales status in a record of four weeks. Their biggest hit single, "Sayonee" (1997), became an instant hit in South Asia and the Middle East, shooting to the top of all the Asian charts, and staying at #1 on both Channel V and MTV Asia for over two months. The band produced an overall two singles and two music videos from the album, the other single being "Yaar Bina".

In 2003, after the release of seventh studio album Dewaar in 2003, bassist Brian O'Connell left the band and returned to his native land United States. Since his departure, Pakistani musician Mekaal Hasan and the band's producer John Alec have been playing bass guitar for live shows in place. Dewaar was the album to have the featured the trio together. In 2005, vocalist Ali Azmat left the band to pursue his career as a solo artist and has released two studio albums to date. Salman Ahmad also went on to pursue his solo career and released his debut solo album, Infiniti in July 2005.

The following is a list of musicians who have performed in Pakistani rock band Junoon.

Current members
Salman Ahmad
Active: 1990–present
Instruments: lead vocals, lead guitar
Release contributions: Junoon (1991), Talaash (1993), Inquilaab (1996), Azadi (1997), Parvaaz (1999), Andaz (2001), Dewaar (2003)
Salman Ahmad (born December 12, 1963) is a Pakistani singer-songwriter, composer, lead guitarist and actor whose work includes one solo albums, Infiniti, released in 2005. While still enjoying the success of Junoon, he was involved in two documentaries with the BBC and is also a UN Goodwill Ambassador for HIV/AIDS. Ahmad is working towards spreading awareness about HIV in South Asia, and helping to bring peace between Pakistan and India. Ahmad is currently teaching at Queens College, City University of New York. Although Junoon's two other core members, Ali Azmat and Brian O'Connell, left the band in 2005, Salman Ahmad continues to perform as a solo artist under the "Junoon" label and has moved to New York after his solo career failed to take off in Pakistan.

Former members
Nusrat Hussain
Active: 1990–1991
Instruments: keyboards
Release contributions: Junoon (1991)
Nusrat Hussain is a Pakistani singer-songwriter, composer and keyboardist. Known best for his composition of the hit song "Dil Dil Pakistan" during his time at the Pakistani pop rock band Vital Signs. When Salman Ahmed, a member of the Vital Signs left the band and went on his separate way, Nusrat joined him to form a new band with Ali Azmat as lead vocalist. After spending some time with Vital Signs and Junoon, Hussain ventured on his own and released a solo album titled Amrit. It was a sincere effort that reflected Nusrat's skills and experience in the music industry. Currently, Nusrat Hussain is a professional pilot and flies the Airbus A310 of Pakistan International Airlines as a Captain (PIA). In 2012, Hussain made a comeback to the Pakistani music industry by releasing a single "Maza Dard Ka".

Ali Azmat
Active: 1990–2005
Instruments: lead vocals, rhythm guitar
Release contributions: Junoon (1991), Talaash (1993), Inquilaab (1996), Azadi (1997), Parvaaz (1999), Andaz (2001), Dewaar (2003)
Ali Azmat (born April 20, 1970) is a Pakistani singer-songwriter, composer, musician and actor whose work includes two solo albums, Social Circus and Klashinfolk, released in 2005 and 2008 respectively. Azmat grew up in Lahore, which he credits for his unconventional attitude. He went to Australia for his higher studies, but due to financial difficulties he returned to Pakistan before completing university. His first band Jupiters was known for performing covers at small gigs, such as weddings, in Lahore. While with them, Azmat wrote his legendary hit song "Dosti". He later sang and recorded "Dosti" with Junoon, after which the song gained national fame. Junoon was Pakistan's biggest band famous for combining traditional poetry and instruments with rock music. Azmat was recruited by Salman Ahmad as the lead vocalist of the band. He left Junoon in 2005 to pursue a solo career.

Brian O'Connell
Active: 1992–2003, 2011
Instruments: bass guitar
Release contributions: Talaash (1993), Inquilaab (1996), Azadi (1997), Parvaaz (1999), Andaz (2001), Dewaar (2003)
Brian O'Connell (born July 20, 1963) is an American bassist, musician and actor. O'Connell and Salman Ahmad, were friends with one another since their high school. Brian O'Connell joined Junoon when keyboardist Nusrat Hussain left the band and Salman Ahmad contacted and invited him to play bass on the band's second album, Talaash. He is known for harmonizing the western 5-string bass riffs with the traditional tabla and drums. After the release of the band's seventh studio album, Dewaar, O'Connell went back to his native land the United States. Since his departure, Pakistani musician Mekaal Hasan and the band's producer John Alec have been playing bass guitar for live shows. He was married to Pakistani actress and model Ayeshah Alam. In 2011, O'Connell rejoined the band to celebrate Junoon's 20th anniversary.

Timeline

Junoon's Line-up

References

External links
 Junoon official website

 
Junoon